"Ol' '55" is a song by American musician Tom Waits. It is the opening track and lead single from Waits' debut studio album, Closing Time, released in March 1973 on Asylum Records. Written by Waits and produced by Jerry Yester, "Ol' '55" was a minor hit. It has been described as more conventional than Waits' later songs. The title, "Ol' '55", refers to the singer's vehicle, almost certainly the legendary 1955 Cadillac Waits owned, although it could refer to other 1955 model year American cars.

The song has been covered by numerous artists, most notably by the Eagles for their 1974 album On The Border. In a 1975 interview, Waits was critical of the Eagles' cover version of his song, admitting that he was "not that particularly crazy about (their) rendition of it ... I thought their version was a little antiseptic." About one year later, while interviewed for NME, he went as far as stating that "I don’t like the Eagles. They’re about as exciting as watching paint dry. Their albums are good for keeping the dust off your turntable and that’s about all.”

The song was used for All Elite Wrestling's Brodie Lee tribute video during his Celebration of Life. AEW President and CEO Tony Khan purchased the rights to the song in perpetuity, saying "so the tribute will last forever".

Cover versions
1974 Eagles on the album On the Border, and a live version on disc 4 of their 2000 compilation Selected Works: 1972-1999. It was also the b-side of the single Best of My Love.
1974 Fairport Convention singer Iain Matthews, on the album Some Days You Eat the Bear
1975 Eric Andersen on the album Be True To You
1980 Richie Havens on the album Connections
1994 Sarah McLachlan on The Freedom Sessions
1999 Acda en De Munnik on the 1999 bonus album Live in de orangerie
1999 K's Choice on the enhanced CD Extra Cocoon - All Access
2009 Sass Jordan on the album From Dusk 'Til Dawn
2010 Gov't Mule covered "Ol' 55" for the first time on July 18, 2010 in Charlotte, NC as an encore performed with Jackie Greene.
2011 Maeve O'Boyle on the album Intermission
2012 Nick & Simon on the album Sterker (Deluxe/ DVD Wisseloord Sessies)
2015 Owen Campbell on the album In the Shadow of the Greats
2019 Shelby Lynne & Allison Moorer on the album Come On Up to the House - Women Sing Waits

References

1973 debut singles
Asylum Records singles
Eagles (band) songs
Iain Matthews songs
Songs written by Tom Waits
Songs about cars
Tom Waits songs